Triplophysa incipiens is a species of ray-finned fish in the genus Triplophysa.

References

incipiens
Taxa named by Solomon Herzenstein
Fish described in 1888